The 2023 FIBA Basketball World Cup is a basketball tournament scheduled to take place from 25 August to 10 September 2023 involving 32 men's national teams from nations affiliated to the International Basketball Federation (FIBA). The tournament will be broadcast all over the world.

Broadcasters
The television rights holders by territory as follows:

References

2023 FIBA Basketball World Cup